A Mahavira Hall, usually simply known as a Main Hall, is the main hall or building in a traditional Chinese Buddhist temple, enshrining representations of Gautama Buddha and various other buddhas and bodhisattvas. It is encountered throughout East Asia.

Names
From their importance and use, they are often simply known in English as the temples' "Main" or "Great Halls". The term "Mahavira Hall", also encountered as "Mahāvīra Hall" or "Hall of the Mahāvīra", is a reverse translation, employing the original Sanskrit term in place of its Chinese or English equivalent. They are also known as the Precious Hall of the Great Hero, the Hall of Great Strength, or the Daxiongbao Hall. Less often, a main hall is called an "adytum", after the equivalent area in Greco-Roman temples. It is also sometimes misunderstood as the "Great, Powerful, and Precious Palace".

Description
Mahavira Hall is the main hall of a Buddhist temple. It is generally located in the north of the Heavenly King Hall and serves as the core architecture of the whole temple and also a place for monks to practice. Statues of Sakyamuni, the founder of Buddhism are enshrined in the hall.

Sakyamuni statues enshrined in the Mahavira Hall have three modeling postures. The first is sitting in the lotus posture with the left hand placing on the left foot and the right hand dropping naturally, representing that he has sacrificed all he has for people before he becomes Buddha. All these can only be proved by the ground. This posture of the statues is called "posture of becoming Buddha". The second is sitting in the lotus posture with the left hand placing on the left foot and the right hand's finger ringing. This is called "posture of preaching", showing his postures when preaching. The third is a standing Buddha with the left hand dropping, signifying the hope that all people can fulfill their wishes, and the right hand stretching arm, indicating all people can relieve their sufferings. This posture is called "Sandalwood Buddha". Usually two disciples' statues are placed next to the statue of Sakyamuni, the older is called "Mahakassapa" and the middle-aged is called "Ānanda".

At the back of Sakyamuni's statue, three statues of Bodhisattva facing the north are usually enshrined. They are Manjusri Bodhisattva riding a lion, Samantabhadra Bodhisattva riding a white elephant and Guanyin Bodhisattva riding a dragon. Some temples also set island scene behind Sakyamuni's statue and only enshrine the statue Guanyin Bodhisattva with a clean vase of water and a willow branch in it.

Examples
 The Main Hall of Shanghai's Jing'an Temple
 The Main Hall of Datong's Shanhua Temple
 The Main Hall of Gaobeidian's Kaishan Temple
 The Main Hall of Yixian's Fengguo Temple
 The Main Hall of Henan's Ocean Banner Temple

See also
 Hall of Four Heavenly Kings, another common hall in Chinese temples
 Hall of Guanyin
 Japanese Buddhist Main Halls, some of which are Chinese-style Mahavira Halls

References

External links

Buddhist architecture
Buddhism in China